Interstate 555 (I-555) is an Interstate Highway that connects Turrell, Arkansas, at I-55 to Jonesboro at Highway 91 (AR 91). Formerly known as U.S. Highway 63 (US 63), the highway was upgraded in the early 21st century to Interstate Highway standards. While I-555 is the second Interstate with all three digits the same to exist, it is the first to be signed as an Interstate. (I-444 in Oklahoma, which was the first highway, is unsigned.)

Route description

The road provides a limited-access highway corridor between Memphis, Tennessee, and Arkansas's fifth-largest city, Jonesboro.

I-555 begins at an interchange of I-55, US 61, and AR 77 in Turrell. I-55 goes south to Memphis, Tennessee. The road parallel to the Interstate, AR 463, is a former alignment of US 63. I-555 passes through farmlands. It passes through Gilmore. Then, it passes through Tyronza and Marked Tree. The section between Tyronza and Marked Tree is also used for farm equipment vehicles to drive on. Next, it passes through Trumann before entering Jonesboro. It briefly has an overlap with US 49. I-555 ends in Jonesboro at an interchange with AR 91; from there, the road continues as US 63.

History
The I-555 route was approved on January 10, 2001, consisting of upgrading the section of US 63 between Turrell to Jonesboro to Interstate standards. A few mainline bridges between Marked Tree and Turrell are from the original two-lane US 63 and are narrower than current Interstate Highway standards, but I-530 was approved in 1999 despite having a similar issue.

The last requirement to formally designate this route as I-555 was the construction of a parallel access road across a floodway between Payneway and Marked Tree, so that farm equipment would no longer have to use US 63 to cross the floodway. To date, no crossing has ever been built, but an exemption of agricultural vehicles was added to I-555 between Marked Tree and Payneway. The exemption was introduced by US Representative Rick Crawford and passed as part of the House Transportation Bill on December 4, 2015. It was announced in December 2015 that I-555 would be officially designated in the spring of 2016. The road was officially dedicated on March 11, 2016, in Jonesboro. Prior to 2021, US 63 followed the entire route of I-555.

Exit list

References

External links

Interstate 555 Arkansas
Putting the "Future" in I-555 (KAIT-TV)

55-5
5
55-5
Transportation in Crittenden County, Arkansas
Transportation in Poinsett County, Arkansas
Transportation in Craighead County, Arkansas
Jonesboro metropolitan area